Urhunden Prizes have been given out each year by the Swedish Comics Association  (Svenska Seriefrämjandet) since 1987. 
There are three categories: Best Swedish (Domestic) Album of the Year (1987–2005), Best Foreign Album of the Year (1987–2005), and the "Unghunden" for best children and youth comics (1994–2005).

The award is named after the Swedish cartoon strip "Urhunden" which was created by Oskar Emil "O.A." Andersson  (1877–1906), who was one of the pioneers in Swedish comics.  It featured a prehistoric man in modern surroundings. The title character was a mixture of a dog and a dinosaur, with erratic and often drastic behavior.

Domestic album
 1987: Alger by Gunnar Krantz
 1988: Gas by Joakim Pirinen
 1989: Ensamma Mamman by Cecilia Torudd
 1990: Arne Anka by Charlie Christensen
 1991: Medan Kaffet Kallnar by Ulf Lundkvist
 1992: Arne Anka Del II by Charlie Christensen
 1993: Uti vår hage 3 by Krister Petersson
 1994: Arne Anka Del III by Charlie Christensen
 1995: Vakuumneger by Max Andersson
 1996: Garagedrömmar by Mats Kjellblad
 1997: Baron Bosse Story (Assar 6) by Ulf Lundkvist
 1998: Hjärteblod by Anders Westerberg
 1999: Allt för Konsten (anthology)
 2000: Rocky by Martin Kellerman
 2001: För Fin för Denna Världen by Daniel Ahlgren
 2002: Fröken Märkvärdig och Karriären by Joanna Rubin Dranger
 2003: Sjunde Våningen by Åsa Grennvall
 2004: Klas Katt Går till Sjöss by Gunnar Lundkvist
 2005: Amatörernas Afton by Anneli Furmark
 2006: Pojken i skogen by Mats Jonsson
 2007: Jag är din flickvän nu by Nina Hemmingsson

Foreign album
 1987: Operation Istanbul by Vittorio Giardino (Italy)
 1988: Maus by Art Spiegelman (USA)
 1989: Den Skrattande Solen (The Laughing Sun) by Gilbert Hernandez (USA)
 1990: Blues i Brallan by Baru (French)
 1991: Sirenens Sång by François Bourgeon (French)
 1992: Watchmen by Alan Moore and Dave Gibbons (USA)
 1993: Maus II by Art Spiegelman (USA)
 1994: Ernie 1 by Bud Grace (USA)
 1995: 1945 (När Kriget Kom 5) by Niels Roland, Morten Hesseldahl and Henrik Rehr (Denmark)
 1996: Serier: Den Osynliga Konsten (Comics: The Unseen Art) by Scott McCloud (USA)
 1997: Den Stora Kokapplöpningen (Bone 4) by Jeff Smith (USA)
 1998: Karu Cell by Kati Kovács (Finland)
 1999: Ed the Happy Clown by Chester Brown (Canada)
 2000: Pappas Flicka (Daddy's Girl) by Debbie Drechsler (USA)
 2001: Vänta Lite... (Hey, Wait...) by Jason (Norway)
 2002: Holmenkollen by Matti Hagelberg (Finland)
 2003: Ghost World by Daniel Clowes (USA)
 2004: Allt för konsten 4 (Nordic anthology)
 2005: Persepolis Book 1 by Marjane Satrapi (Iran/France)
 2006: V for Vendetta by Alan Moore and David Lloyd (UK/USA)
 2007: Broderier (Broderies) by Marjane Satrapi (Iran/France)

Unghunden
 1994: Rune Andréasson
 1995: Peter Madsen, Henning Kure, Per Vadmand and Hans Rancke-Madsen
 1996: Måns Gahrton and Johan Unenge
 1997: Magnus Knutsson
 1998: Don Rosa
 1999: Bryan Talbot
 2000: Bokfabriken
 2001: Carlsen Comics
 2002: Mats Källblad
 2003: Kamratposten
 2004: Bamse-redaktionen
 2005: Johan Andreasson
 2006: Helena Magnusson
 2007: Ulf Granberg
 2009: Jan Lööf

See also
 Adamson Award (another Swedish comic book award)

References

External links
  Seriefrämjandet official website

Comics awards
Swedish comics
Swedish awards